Pierre Denan is the author of Pourquoi Tom Cruise: Book 1 (2010), Pourquoi Tom Cruise: Book 2 (2015) news ticker tales published by les Presses du réel as part of their Literature Collection—Fiction. He has also published: Libre (2002–2005), Paradis (2015), and Voilà, A Collection, Notes for the Book to Come (2016).

His artwork is exhibited at Multiples Gallery, on the Internet and in artists' publications. His books on art include Poulet Poulet, R. Thomas, JE, and Dragon Eye. He has also contributed to Grams of Art, and AH AH AH. His paintings represent the bulk of his visual diary, and are partly gathered in Pierre Denan Diary: A Selection of Works, published by Presses du réel in 2014. Their formal vocabulary has been borrowed from Steven Parrino—though they have dropped the American artist's dramatic, deathlike dimension, as well as his elements of mannerism and folkloric post-punk and biker spirit.

In 2000 he created M19, a press devoted to contemporary art. Since then, he has acted as both editor and artistic director for art books and journals such as: MAP (a pamphlet poster distributed in galleries at the beginning of the 2000s, 1200 copies), AH AH AH  a creative journal, 20/27 a critical art review, 2870 Grams of Art an art journal, and I.S. Inventaire Supplémentaire, a collection of art books.

Career

Pierre Denan is the author of Pourquoi Tom Cruise (2007), a text with which he defined the "news ticker tale" concept, a genre inspired by the continuous display of news items at the bottom of some news channel screens. Book 1 was published in 2010; Book 2, in 2015; Book 3 is currently in progress. He is also the author of Libre –a series of four texts that were printed as booklets and made available to the public in galleries and other Paris-based contemporary art venues from 2002 to 2005–, of Paradis (2015), and Voilà, A Collection, Notes for the Book to Come (2016).

His artwork is exhibited at Multiples Gallery, Paris, on the Internet, and in art journals. He is the author of artist's books. The generic titles of the different open works in progress in the framework of his art are: "Opening themes series", "Variations Marshall", and "Miss Manga Project". According to the artist, Miss Manga, a manipulated, black, monochromatic painting, forms the central part of his visual journal. This artwork is in part gathered in Pierre Denan Diary, a Selection of Works (2014).

In 2000 he created M19 Editions (May 19), which is devoted to contemporary art. The aim is for artists to release their unpublished works, critics and art historians to generate studies on art that is currently in progress, as well as "to bring theoretical criticism to the panorama of francophone reviews and direct access to artworks". Denan creates and publishes books and journals, acting as both editor and art director.

In 2015, he founded JakeAfterShow, a creative studio, whose name evokes the legend of an image of Jake, a guy we can imagine sitting on a couch after a fashion show, a party, perhaps photographed by Nan Goldin—, and which has the following baseline: we make stories. It will produce a print and web magazine in 2017.

About Pourquoi Tom Cruise, Denan has written:The news ticker tale Pourquoi Tom Cruise is a stroke, a flow with a form inspired by the continuous display of titles and dispatching of new media on the news channel screens. It is a narrative composed of elements hailing from online newsfeeds—a hot spot for fiction—, borrowings from literature, references to films, music, and art, but also of a whole fictional, original context. It is characterized by the predictability of its contents, ceaselessly reverting to what has already been uttered. As the tale’s main character—and non-subject—Tom Cruise incarnates the paranoid, unabashed, terrorized, organized, young, sustainable hyperme of our hypermodern times. Here is a hyperCruise, a hypercharacter, the absolute trademark of "modernity heightened to a superlative power", but also, the mask behind which I write my own song. Pierre Denan

Selected works

Writer

2002–2005 Libre, M19
2003 Libre in Bordel (review) n° 3 :fr:Bordel (revue), Flammarion, Paris
2010 Pourquoi Tom Cruise, book 1, Les presses du Réel, Dijon
2010-today Pierre Denan websites and social networks
2015 Pourquoi Tom Cruise, book 2, Les presses du Réel, Dijon
2015 Paradis in Le Cafard Hérétique, n° 5, 
2016 Pourquoi Tom Cruise, reading, book 2, extract, Palais de Tokyo, Paris
2016 Voilà, Une collection, work in progress, forthcoming
2016 Pourquoi Tom Cruise, reading, Centre Pompidou, Paris, September 15
2018 Pourquoi Tom Cruise, book 3
2018-2020 Journal, Pierre Denan Journal

Artist

1998 Personnes en quête d’un divertissement, short-film (actor, director)
2002 Poulet Poulet, artist book, M19
2002 R. Thomas, artist book, I.S. Inventaire Supplémentaire collection, M19
2003 JE, artist book, M19
2005 Dragon Eye, artist book, M19
2005 Come Again, performances at Galerie du Forum and Les Abattoirs, Toulouse
2007 2860 Grams of art, artists's magazine, M19 (artworks)
2008 2870 Grams of art, artists's magazine, M19 (artworks)
2010-today Pierre Denan websites and social networks
2011 AH AH AH, artists's magazine, M19 (artworks), read the magazine online
2011 Pour le Mur, exhibition, solo show, Galerie de Multiples, Paris
2014 Pierre Denan Diary, a selection of works, Les presses du réel, Dijon
2015 « Mauvais Genre » exhibition, group show, Addict Gallery, Paris
2017 « Road is a road is a road… » exhibition, group show, GDM Galerie de Multiples, Paris
2017 « Culbuteurs » exhibition, group show, Le Garage, Paris
2018 « Blind-Marché », a group show curated by Samuel Boutruche for Le Consultat, Ramapano, Paris
2019  « It’s a Wonderful Life », Group Show, Gilles Drouault Galerie/Multiples

Publisher

2000 The birth of M19 editions (May 19)
2000–2004 MAP, contemporary art critic, M19
2002–2009 « I.S. Inventaire Supplémentaire » collection, artists's books, M19
2007 2860 Grams of art, artists's magazine, M19
2008 2870 Grams of art, artists's magazine, M19
2007–2012 20/27, art critic, with Michel Gauthier and Arnauld Pierre, M19
2011 AH AH AH, artists's magazine, M19

References

External links
 Pierre Denan website
 Pierre Denan Journal
 Pierre's Facebook profil
 Les presses du réel
 GDM Galerie de multiples, Paris
 CNAP Centre national des arts plastiques
 Centre Pompidou, Paris
 Readings, Pourquoi Tom Cruise, Youtube Channel, english subtitles

21st-century French non-fiction writers
Living people
French contemporary artists
French publishers (people)
Writers from Paris
Year of birth missing (living people)